Geoffrey "Geoff" William Coates (born 1966) is an American chemist and the Tisch University Professor in the Department of Chemistry and Chemical Biology at Cornell University.

Early life and education 
Coates was born in 1966 in Evansville, Indiana. He received a B.A. degree in Chemistry from Wabash College in 1989. He entered graduate school at Stanford University where he worked with Robert M. Waymouth as a Hertz Fellow. His thesis work investigated the stereoselectivity of metallocene-based Ziegler-Natta catalysts. He was awarded a Ph.D. in Organic Chemistry in 1994. Coates then was a NSF Postdoctoral Fellow with Robert H. Grubbs at the California Institute of Technology. At Caltech, Coates worked on ring-closing metathesis reactions to functionalize polyolefins, and supramolecular phenyl-perfluorophenyl pi-stacking interactions.

Independent career 
In 1997, Coates joined the faculty of Cornell University. He was promoted to Associate Professor in 2001, and to Professor in 2002. He was appointed to the first Tisch University Professorship in 2008.

Selected honors and professional activities 
Coates has received numerous awards for his work in organometallic and polymer chemistry.

 Alfred P. Sloan Foundation Research Fellow
 ACS Arthur C. Cope Scholar Award
Named by the MIT Technology Review as a TR100 Innovator Under 35, in 1999
David and Lucile Packard Foundation Fellowship in Science and Engineering in 2000
Regional Finalist of the Blavatanik Award in 2007 and 2008
 Elected member of American Academy of Arts & Sciences in 2011 
Camille and Henry Dreyfus New Faculty Award in 1997 and Camille Dreyfus Teacher-Scholar Award in 2000
American Association for the Advancement of Science Fellow in 2006
 ACS Carl S. Marvel Creative Polymer Chemistry Award in 2009
 Elected member of National Academy of Inventors in 2017
 Elected member of National Academy of Sciences in 2017
Scientific Advisory Board for the Welch Foundation in 2020
 2023 NAS Award for the Industrial Application of Science

Entrepreneurship and affiliations 
Coates is the scientific cofounder of Novomer, Ecolectro, Intermix Performance Materials, and Imperion Coatings. Novomer was acquired by Danimer Scientific in 2021. Coates is a member of the Scientific Advisory Board of KensaGroup and is a member of the Scientific Advisory Board of the Welch Foundation.  Coates was an Associate Editor of the journal Macromolecules from 2008 to 2021, and is now an Associate Editor of the Journal of the American Chemical Society.

References 

American chemists
Cornell University faculty
Wabash College alumni
Stanford University alumni
Living people
1966 births